Khanom phing is a round Thai cookie consisting of tapioca flour, coconut milk, and egg yolk.

History
Khanom phing is believed to have been introduced to Thailand by the Portuguese in the 17th century.

Evolution

The original Khamon phing had a sweet taste, fragrant, brown color, and immediately melted in the mouth. It was different from today, as now the cookie has more colors such as pink, green, and yellow. In addition, the dessert is made harder than the original, due to needing protection from breaking when packed for sale. The original Khanom phing was packed in a small jar and adorned with ribbons to be given as a gift on New Year's Day.

See also
 List of Thai desserts
Macaroon

References

External links
เด็กหญิง อินทิรา กุณวงษ์. (2009, December 18). ขนมผิง. Retrieved October 15, 2014 https://www.l3nr.org/posts/327440
Thailand: Khanom Phing. Retrieved October 15, 2014 http://globalcookies.blogspot.com/2008/01/thailand-khanom-phing.html

Thai desserts and snacks
Cookies
Foods containing coconut